This list of bisexual people includes notable people who identify or have been identified as bisexual.

N

O

P

Q

R

S

References

N
Lists of LGBT-related people
people N